Grenoble metropolitan area as defined by INSEE in 2020 is the functional urban area of the city of Grenoble, southeastern France. It covers 204 communes, all in the Isère department. Grenoble and 15 other communes form the pôle urbain or urban cluster, the other 188 communes form the couronne or commuter belt. The most populous communes in the functional area are Grenoble, Échirolles, Fontaine, Meylan, Le Pont-de-Claix, Saint-Égrève, Saint-Martin-d'Hères, Sassenage, Seyssinet-Pariset and Voiron, all except Voiron part of the pôle urbain. It is the 11th-most populous functional urban area in France.

Communes
The communes of the functional area of Grenoble are:

Les Adrets
L'Albenc
Allevard
Apprieu
Autrans-Méaudre-en-Vercors
Avignonet
Barraux
Beaucroissant
Beaulieu
Beauvoir-en-Royans
Bernin
Bévenais
Bilieu
Biviers
Bresson
Brié-et-Angonnes
La Buisse
La Buissière
Champagnier
Le Champ-près-Froges
Champ-sur-Drac
Chamrousse
Chantesse
Charavines
Charnècles
Château-Bernard
Le Cheylas
Chichilianne
Chirens
Cholonge
Claix
Clelles
Cognet
Cognin-les-Gorges
Colombe
La Combe-de-Lancey
Corenc
Corrençon-en-Vercors
Coublevie
Cras
Crêts-en-Belledonne
Crolles
Domène
Échirolles
Engins
Eybens
La Flachère
Fontaine
Fontanil-Cornillon
La Forteresse
Froges
Gières
Goncelin
Le Grand-Lemps
Grenoble
Gresse-en-Vercors
Le Gua
Herbeys
Hurtières
Izeaux
Izeron
Jarrie
Laffrey
Lans-en-Vercors
Laval-en-Belledonne
Livet-et-Gavet
Lumbin
Marcieu
Massieu
Mayres-Savel
Meylan
Miribel-Lanchâtre
Miribel-les-Échelles
Moirans
Monestier-de-Clermont
Le Monestier-du-Percy
Montaud
Montbonnot-Saint-Martin
Montchaboud
Monteynard
Montferrat
Mont-Saint-Martin
Morette
La Motte-d'Aveillans
La Motte-Saint-Martin
Le Moutaret
La Mure
La Murette
Murianette
Nantes-en-Ratier
Serre-Nerpol
Notre-Dame-de-Commiers
Notre-Dame-de-l'Osier
Notre-Dame-de-Mésage
Notre-Dame-de-Vaulx
Noyarey
Oyeu
Villages du Lac de Paladru
Percy
La Pierre
Pierre-Châtel
Plan
Plateau-des-Petites-Roches
Poisat
Poliénas
Ponsonnas
Pontcharra
Le Pont-de-Claix
Proveysieux
Prunières
Quaix-en-Chartreuse
Quincieu
Réaumont
Renage
Revel
Rives
La Rivière
Roissard
Rovon
Sainte-Agnès
Saint-Andéol
Saint-Arey
Saint-Aupre
Saint-Barthélemy-de-Séchilienne
Saint-Blaise-du-Buis
Saint-Cassien
Saint-Égrève
Saint-Étienne-de-Crossey
Saint-Geoirs
Saint-Georges-de-Commiers
Saint-Gervais
Saint-Guillaume
Saint-Honoré
Saint-Ismier
Saint-Jean-de-Moirans
Saint-Jean-de-Vaulx
Saint-Jean-d'Hérans
Saint-Jean-le-Vieux
Saint-Joseph-de-Rivière
Saint-Laurent-du-Pont
Sainte-Marie-d'Alloix
Sainte-Marie-du-Mont
Saint-Martin-de-Clelles
Saint-Martin-de-la-Cluze
Saint-Martin-d'Hères
Saint-Martin-d'Uriage
Saint-Martin-le-Vinoux
Saint-Maurice-en-Trièves
Saint-Maximin
Saint-Michel-les-Portes
Saint-Mury-Monteymond
Saint-Nazaire-les-Eymes
Saint-Nicolas-de-Macherin
Saint-Nizier-du-Moucherotte
Saint-Paul-de-Varces
Saint-Paul-d'Izeaux
Saint-Paul-lès-Monestier
Saint-Pierre-de-Chartreuse
Saint-Pierre-de-Chérennes
Saint-Pierre-de-Méaroz
Saint-Pierre-de-Mésage
Saint-Quentin-sur-Isère
Saint-Sulpice-des-Rivoires
Saint-Théoffrey
Saint-Vérand
Saint-Vincent-de-Mercuze
La Salle-en-Beaumont
Le Sappey-en-Chartreuse
Sarcenas
Sassenage
Séchilienne
Seyssinet-Pariset
Seyssins
Siévoz
Sillans
Sinard
Sousville
La Sure en Chartreuse
Susville
Têche
Tencin
La Terrasse
Theys
Le Touvet
Treffort
La Tronche
Tullins
La Valette
Varces-Allières-et-Risset
Vatilieu
Vaulnaveys-le-Bas
Vaulnaveys-le-Haut
Venon
Le Versoud
Veurey-Voroize
Vif
Villard-Bonnot
Villard-de-Lans
Villard-Saint-Christophe
Vinay
Vizille
Voiron
Voreppe
Vourey

Organisation 
This statistic-based metropolitan area is divided into multiple administrative divisions. Among them are:
 Métropole of Grenoble-Alpes Métropole,
 Agglomeration community of Pays Voironnais,
 Communauté de communes du Pays du Grésivaudan,
 Communauté de communes du Sud Grenoblois,
 Communauté de communes du Masif du Vercors

See also 
Grenoble urban unit

References 

Grenoble
Metropolitan areas of France